Mathis on Broadway is an album by American pop singer Johnny Mathis that was released on April 25, 2000, by Columbia Records and focuses upon songs included in musicals from the previous two decades.

Reception
Reviews of the singer's most recent tribute to the Great White Way were positive: Michael Portantiere of TheaterMania.com wrote that "Mathis comes across with the smooth, rich, velvety vocalism for which he is legendary," noting that certain songs covered on the album "require the kind of breath support, legato, and phrasing that precious few singers of Mathis's age can supply. But this guy still has the right stuff, in abundance." Billboard magazine echoed these sentiments: "The legendary performer breathes fresh perspective into songs that might sound overdone in lesser hands." And William Ruhlmann of AllMusic goes so far as to say that "the lesser talents among the composers -- Lloyd Webber, Wildhorn, Claude-Michel Schönberg -- owe Mathis a debt for making their music sound so good, while Sondheim can be grateful that Mathis makes him sound so accessible.

Track listing
From the liner notes for the original album:

 "On Broadway"  from Smokey Joe's Cafe  (Barry Mann, Cynthia Weil, Jerry Leiber, Mike Stoller) – 3:24
 William Ross – producer, arranger, conductor  
 Jay Landers – producer  
 Richard Jay-Alexander – producer  
 Al Schmitt – recording engineer, mixing engineer  
 Randy Waldman – piano  
 David Boruff – saxophone  
 Dean Parks – guitar  
 Chuck Domanico – bass  
 John Robinson – drums  
 Paulinho da Costa – percussion  
 Alex Acuña – percussion  
 Efrain Toro – percussion  
 Maxine Waters – background vocals  
 Julia Waters – background vocals  
 Oren Waters – background vocals  
 "Life Is Just a Bowl of Cherries"  from Fosse (featuring Forever Plaid)  (Lew Brown, Ray Henderson) – 2:46
 Jorge Calandrelli – producer, arranger, conductor  
 Jay Landers – producer  
 Richard Jay-Alexander – producer  
 Al Schmitt – recording engineer, mixing engineer  
 Randy Waldman – piano  
 David Boruff – saxophone  
 Dean Parks – guitar  
 Chuck Domanico – bass  
 John Robinson – drums  
 Leo Daignault – Forever Plaid  
 David Engel – Forever Plaid  
 Jason Graae – Forever Plaid  
 Michael Winther – Forever Plaid  
 "Loving You" from Passion  (Stephen Sondheim) – 4:38
 Jonathan Tunick – producer, arranger, conductor  
 Jay Landers – producer  
 Richard Jay-Alexander – producer  
 Frank Wolf – recording engineer, mixing engineer  
 "They Live in You"  from The Lion King (Lebo M., Mark Mancina, Jay Rifkin) – 4:13
 Randy Waldman – producer, arranger, recording engineer; keyboards and programming  
 Jay Landers – producer  
 Richard Jay-Alexander – producer  
 Lebo M. – coproducer; choir arranger and conductor  
 Kevin Clark – recording engineer  
 Ray Bardini – recording engineer  
 Frank Wolf – mixing engineer  
 Neil Stubenhaus – bass  
 Nandi Morake – choir  
 Ntombikhona Dlamini – choir  
 Lindiwe Dlamini – choir  
 Lindiwe Hlengwa– choir  
 Bonginkosi Kulu – choir  
 Ronald Kunene– choir  
 Anthony Manough – choir  
 Philip McAdoo – choir  
 Rema Webb – choir  
 "Bring Him Home"  from Les Misérables  (Alain Boublil, Herbert Kretzmer, Claude-Michel Schönberg) – 3:23
 William Ross – producer, arranger, conductor  
 Jay Landers – producer  
 Richard Jay-Alexander – producer  
 Frank Wolf – recording engineer, mixing engineer  
 Medley (featuring Betty Buckley)   – 5:45  a. "Children Will Listen" from Into the Woods   (Stephen Sondheim)  b. "Our Children"  from Ragtime  (Lynn Ahrens, Stephen Flaherty)
 William Ross – producer, arranger, conductor  
 Jay Landers – producer  
 Richard Jay-Alexander – producer  
 Frank Wolf – recording engineer  
 Al Schmitt – mixing engineer  
 "All I Ask of You" from The Phantom of the Opera  (Charles Hart, Andrew Lloyd Webber, Richard Stilgoe) – 4:15
 William Ross – producer, arranger, conductor  
 Jay Landers – producer  
 Richard Jay-Alexander – producer  
 Frank Wolf – recording engineer  
 Al Schmitt – mixing engineer  
 "Once Upon a Dream" from Jekyll & Hyde  (Leslie Bricusse, Steve Cuden, Frank Wildhorn) – 5:10
 Jay Landers – producer  
 Richard Jay-Alexander – producer  
 Megan Cavallari – arranger  
 Frank Wolf – recording engineer, mixing engineer  
 William Ross – conductor  
 "Seasons of Love"  from Rent (featuring Nell Carter)  (Jonathan Larson) – 4:08
 Randy Waldman – producer, arranger, recording engineer; keyboards and programming  
 Jay Landers – producer  
 Richard Jay-Alexander – producer  
 Megan Cavallari – choir arranger and conductor  
 Kevin Clark – recording engineer  
 Frank Wolf – mixing engineer  
 Nathan East – bass  
 Maxine Waters – choir  
 Julia Waters – choir  
 Oren Waters – choir  
 Luther Waters – choir  
 Sally Stevens – choir  
 Terry Wood – choir  
 Bobbi Page – choir  
 Carmen Twillie – choir  
 Angie Jaree – choir  
 Ginger Freers – choir  
 Susan Boyd – choir  
 Jeffrey Polk – choir  
 Jim Gilstrap – choir  
 Rick Logan – choir  
 Josef Powell – choir  
 Jon Joyce – choir

Personnel
From the liner notes for the original album:

Johnny Mathis – vocals
 Jay Landers – executive producer
Richard Jay-Alexander – executive producer
Robbie Buchanan – additional vocal production
Bill Smith – associate producer and engineering
Martie Kolbl – production coordinator
Patti Zimmitti – orchestra contractor
Debbi Datz-Pyle – orchestra contractor
Jo Ann Kane – music preparation
Matt Della Polla – scoring coordinator for William Ross
Lenny LaCroix – rehearsal pianist
Charlie Paakkari – assistant engineer
John Sorensen – assistant engineer
John Hendrickson – assistant engineer
James McCrone – assistant engineer
Alan Sanderson – assistant engineer
Jenny Knotts – assistant engineer
Doug Sax – mastering
Laura Grover – liner notes editor
Peter Fletcher – product manager
Bob Semanovich – product manager
Christine Wilson – art direction
David Vance – photography
Mastered at The Mastering Lab, Hollywood, California

References

2000 albums
Johnny Mathis albums
Columbia Records albums
Covers albums